James H. Robinson may refer to:

James H. Robinson (soldier) (died 1864), American Union Army soldier
James Harvey Robinson (1863–1936), American historian
James Herman Robinson (1907–1972), American clergyman and humanitarian
Dr. J.H. Robinson, pseudonym of American popular fiction writer, Sylvanus Cobb Jr. (1823–1887)

See also
James Robinson (disambiguation)